Hughes Brook is a town in the Canadian province of Newfoundland and Labrador. The town had a population of 236 in the Canada 2021 Census. It is located to the northeast of Corner Brook, in the western Bay of Islands area.

Demographics 

See also
 List of cities and towns in Newfoundland and Labrador

References

Towns in Newfoundland and Labrador